Jagannath Temple,(Odia: ଶ୍ରୀ ଜଗନ୍ନାଥ ମନ୍ଦିର) Gunupur, stands at the eastern end of the town Gunupur in the Old Gunupur area. The old temple was built by the Jeypore Maharaja Vikramadeb more than 100 years back.

History 
Lord Jagannath, Balabhadra and Subhadra are the main deities in the temple. The present structure of the temple, with a new look, has been built in the year 1997. The old structure stands beside the new Temple.

The temple is at a distance of  180 km  from Sabara Shreekhetra Koraput.

See also 
 List of Temples in Rayagada district

References

Hindu temples in Rayagada district
Temples dedicated to Jagannath